Brett Baer is an American television producer, actor, and screenwriter who has worked on many successful television shows. Baer often works with his screenwriting partner Dave Finkel.

Writing work 
 New Girl (2011-2018)
 30 Rock (2006)
 Joey (2005)
 The Norm Show
 Duckman
 Argo and York (Pilot)

External links 
 

American television producers
American television writers
American male television writers
Living people
Writers Guild of America Award winners
Place of birth missing (living people)
Year of birth missing (living people)
21st-century American screenwriters
21st-century American male writers